World Class is the first studio album by American Los Angeles-based electro-hop group World Class Wreckin' Cru. It was released in 1985 under the Kru-Cut record label. Songs on the album included "Juice" and "Surgery", which were popular singles on the underground West Coast scene.

The album cover was used as a form of ridicule to Dr. Dre in Eazy-E's diss song "Real Muthaphuckkin G's" showing the album images of Dr. Dre on the album wearing flashy clothing and makeup. The style was later attributed to the fashion sense of Prince which was heavily popular at the time. It was also parodied by Luther Campbell on the song "Cowards Of Compton".

Track listing
All songs produced by Lonzo & The Wreckin Cru.

Personnel
 Alonzo Williams - vocals, bass, producer
 Andre Young - vocals, drum programming, producer
 Antoine Carraby - vocals, drum programming, producer
 Marquette Hawkins - vocals, keyboards, producer
 Mona Lisa Young - vocals
 Bernie Grundman - mastering
 Donovan Smith - engineer
 Don MacMillan - art direction
 Duane Blanks - hair styles

References

1985 debut albums
Albums produced by Dr. Dre
Albums produced by DJ Yella
World Class Wreckin' Cru albums